Xenopsis is a genus of beetles in the family Buprestidae, containing the following species:

 Xenopsis akiyamai Volkovitsh, 2009
 Xenopsis boschmai Thery, 1935
 Xenopsis kubani Volkovitsh, 2009
 Xenopsis laevis Saunders, 1867
 Xenopsis pacholatkoi Volkovitsh, 2008
 Xenopsis violaceocyanea Volkovitsh, 2008
 Xenopsis woodleyi Volkovitsh, 2008

References

Buprestidae genera
Taxa named by Edward Saunders (entomologist)